The first government of José Luis Rodríguez Zapatero was formed on 18 August 2004, following the latter's election as Prime Minister of Spain by the Congress of Deputies on 16 August and his swearing-in on 17 August, as a result of the Spanish Socialist Workers' Party (PSOE) emerging as the largest parliamentary force at the 2004 Spanish general election.

The cabinet comprised members of the PSOE (including its sister party, the Socialists' Party of Catalonia, PSC) and a number of independents. It was automatically dismissed on 10 March 2008 as a consequence of the 2008 general election, but remained in acting capacity until the next government was sworn in.

Investiture

Cabinet changes
Zapatero's first government saw a number of cabinet changes during its tenure:
On 7 April 2006, José Bono's stepping down as Minister of Defence out of personal motives, a decision which had been taken throughout the months prior, led to the first cabinet reshuffle of Zapatero's premiership. José Antonio Alonso replaced Bono in Defence, and in turn he was replaced by Alfredo Pérez Rubalcaba as Minister of the Interior. María Jesús San Segundo was replaced by Mercedes Cabrera as Minister of Education and Science. The new ministers were sworn into office on 11 April.
On 8 September 2006, José Montilla stepped down as Minister of Industry, Tourism and Trade in order to run as the Socialists' Party of Catalonia (PSC)'s candidate for President of the Government of Catalonia in the 2006 Catalan regional election. He was succeeded by Mayor of Barcelona Joan Clos.
On 12 February 2007, Mariano Fernández Bermejo replaced Juan Fernando López Aguilar as Minister of Justice, after the latter's decision to lead the Spanish Socialist Workers' Party (PSOE) into the 2007 Canarian regional election. López Aguilar had been nominated unopposed as the party's leading candidate for President of the Canary Islands on 28 October 2006, after several months of speculation.
On 9 July 2007, a second major cabinet reshuffle saw Bernat Soria replacing Elena Salgado as Minister of Health and Consumer Affairs, who in turn replaced Jordi Sevilla in the Public Administrations ministry. María Antonia Trujillo was replaced by Carme Chacón as Minister of Housing, and César Antonio Molina became the new officeholder of the Culture portfolio replacing Carmen Calvo.

Council of Ministers
The Council of Ministers was structured into the offices for the prime minister, the two deputy prime ministers, 16 ministries and the post of the spokesperson of the Government.

Departmental structure
José Luis Rodríguez Zapatero's first government was organised into several superior and governing units, whose number, powers and hierarchical structure varied depending on the ministerial department.

Unit/body rank
() Secretary of state
() Undersecretary
() Director-general
() Autonomous agency
() Military & intelligence agency

Notes

References

External links
Governments. Juan Carlos I (20.11.1975 ...). CCHS-CSIC (in Spanish).
Governments of Spain 2004–2011. Ministers of José Luis Rodríguez Zapatero. Historia Electoral.com (in Spanish).
The governments of the second period of the Spanish Socialist Workers' Party (2004–2011). Lluís Belenes i Rodríguez History Page (in Spanish).

2004 establishments in Spain
2008 disestablishments in Spain
Cabinets established in 2004
Cabinets disestablished in 2008
Council of Ministers (Spain)